Bellway plc is a residential property developer and housebuilder based in Newcastle upon Tyne, England.  It is listed on the London Stock Exchange and is a constituent of the FTSE 250 Index.

History 
 

The company was founded in 1946 by John Thomas Bell and his sons John and Russell as a housebuilder operating in Newcastle upon Tyne under the name John T. Bell & Sons. In 1951 Kenneth Bell, the youngest of the brothers, joined the business.

The three brothers also developed commercial property in the 1950s and their company, North British Properties, was floated on the London Stock Exchange in 1961. In 1963, North British acquired John T Bell in a reverse takeover.

The Bell family managed to tap into the huge demand for private housing that followed World War II promoting developments such as Cramlington New Town, built in partnership with William Leech in the early 1960s. Bellway developed a substantial housebuilding operation in the north of England and sales reached 1,500 units in 1972 with a further 500 in the newly formed Australian and French subsidiaries. In 1973, Bellway moved into the south-east with the purchase of A & R A Searle. The group continued to expand through England in the 1970s but its overseas operations were less successful and were eventually closed.

In 1979, the "Bellway" private housebuilding business was demerged from the commercial side of the business under the leadership of Kenneth Bell. In 1981 Bellway and fellow Newcastle housebuilder William Leech announced a merger but it was called off within days: "the lifestyle of the two firms looked pretty incompatible".

Diversification had not been wholly satisfactory; Ken Bell became largely non-executive and the day-to-day running of the business was assumed by Howard Dawe. Dawe reorganised the business, resumed the regional expansion on a more profitable basis and increased the company's focus on regeneration sites.

Family involvement with the company ended with the death of Kenneth Bell in 1997.

In 2018, the company was reported to be on track to build 10,000 homes for the first time in its history. This activity was attributed to low interest rates and good mortgage finance providing buoyancy to the housing market.

In common with other housebuilders, Bellway was adversely affected by the COVID-19 pandemic in the United Kingdom during 2020; in June, it reported sales had fallen by more than two-thirds since the introduction of lockdown, and expected "year-on-year sales activity to be severely constrained until a time when 'lockdown' restrictions are further lifted." A month later, it announced plans to cut up to 175 jobs, around 6% of its 3,100-strong workforce.

Fire safety concerns
A major fire broke out in July 2015 at a housing development constructed by Bellway in Canterbury, which destroyed and damaged 45 homes. An investigation launched in 2016 discovered problems in the fire separation constructed between the properties. Repairs to the development began in November 2018.

In May 2019, a Watchdog investigation was screened on BBC One regarding the fire safety of Bellway and Persimmon plc homes. In the programme a surveyor visited an estate developed by Bellway after concerns about fire safety had been raised by a resident. The investigation found safety breaches in every property that was looked at due to poorly fitted fire barriers.

On 9 June 2019, a fire took place at the newly built Samuel Garside House located in De Pass Garden, which was constructed by Bellway. Peter Mason, chair of the Barking Reach residents’ association had contacted Bellway prior to the fire expressing concern about the potential fire risk of the development, but was told not to worry. London mayor Sadiq Khan described the fire as "shocking" and stated that it could have "easily resulted in fatalities".

In June 2021, protesters picketed the Bellway offices in Prestwich and Beckton to demand that the company repair numerous fire safety issues which had been discovered in their properties. The safety issues left residents "living in fear" and unable to sell or remortgage their homes.

In 2021, a number fire safety issues were found in Bellway's Lamba Court complex in Salford. A number of cavity barriers were found to be inadequately secured, missing or stuffed with plastic bubble wrap. It was reported that some  residents faced bankruptcy from the "ruinous costs" for the repairs and one resident spoke to the press about how the stress has taken a significant toll on her mental health.

In October 2022, Bellway reported it had made provisions for post-Grenfell cladding and safety improvements totalling £346.2m in its latest results. Its cumulative total for such improvements was £513.7m.

Operations 
The company achieved a 5 star rating in the 2015/16 Home Builders Federation new home customer satisfaction survey.

References

External links 

 Official site

Construction and civil engineering companies established in 1946
Housebuilding companies of the United Kingdom
Companies listed on the London Stock Exchange
Companies based in Newcastle upon Tyne
1946 establishments in England
Real estate companies established in 1946
Construction and civil engineering companies of England
British companies established in 1946